Alexander Dmitriyevich Dubyago (Александр Дмитриевич Дубяго in Russian) (December 5(18), 1903, Kazan - October 29, 1959, Kazan) was a Soviet astronomer and expert in theoretical astrophysics. The lunar crater Dubyago is named after him and his father, Dmitry Ivanovich Dubyago.

References

1903 births
1959 deaths
Scientists from Kazan
Soviet astronomers